Heathcote School  may refer to:
in Australia
Heathcote High School, New South Wales
in England
Heathcote School, Essex
The Heathcote School, Hertfordshire
Heathcote School, Chingford, Greater London